Imperial Capital may refer to:
 Rome, as the Roman Empire
 Constantinople, as New Rome in the Byzantine Period of Eastern Roman Empire and later in the Ottoman Empire
 Córdoba, Spain, as the Caliphate of Córdoba
 Delhi, as the Delhi Sultanate
 Imperial Capital Bank, a part of City National Bank (California)

See also
 Imperial City (disambiguation)
 Capital city
 Capital (economics)